Anthony Kalik (born 5 November 1997) is an Australian professional footballer who plays as a midfielder for Hajduk Split.

Born in Sydney, Kalik played youth football at Manly United FC and was then offered a 2 year scholarship at the Australian Institute of Sport before making his professional debut for Central Coast Mariners.

Kalik has represented Australia at under-20 level.

Early life
Kalik is of Croatian origin. Both of his parents came to Australia from the island of Korčula, at time part of Yugoslavia. His father Denis, a former football player for BŠK Zmaj, coming from Blato and his mother Francis coming from Vela Luka.

Club career

Central Coast Mariners
In 2013, Kalik signed a three-year deal with Central Coast Mariners, making him the youngest professional footballer in Australia. He made his competitive debut for the club in a win over Palm Beach in the 2014 FFA Cup, coming on for Glen Trifiro with ten minutes remaining. Kalik made his A-League debut in a victory over Adelaide United in February 2015.

Hajduk Split
On 1 February 2016 the Mariners announced that Kalik had been loaned to Hajduk Split until at least June 2016. He was recommended to the club by fellow Australian and former Hajduk player Josip Skoko. He made his first team debut for the club in the controversial 2–1 away loss to NK Lokomotiva, coming in at half-time for Manuel Arteaga. He managed to get 11 caps for Hajduk that season and make it into the first lineup as well.

On 28 May 2016, Hajduk Split bought him for 32,000 euros. For Hajduk, it was the first time since 2012 that they paid a transfer fee for a player.

Loan to Sydney FC
Kalik returned to Australia in September 2017 on loan, to play for Sydney FC in the 2017–18 season. At the end of the season he returned to Hajduk Split.

Loan to NK Rudeš
In July 2018 he joined Croatian Prva HNL club NK Rudeš on loan along with Frane Vojković. He had 16 appearances during first part of the season, which NK Rudeš concluded as the last team in the league. During winter break he returned to HNK Hajduk Split.

International career
Kalik was selected for the Australia U-20 squad for 2014 AFC U-19 Championship qualification in October 2013. He made his debut in a win over Chinese Taipei.

Career statistics

Honours

Club
Hajduk II
 Croatian Third Football League South: 2016–17

Sydney FC
A-League Premiership: 2017–18
FFA Cup: 2017

Records
 Youngest Central Coast Mariners player: 16 years, 347 days

See also
 List of Central Coast Mariners FC players

References

External links

1997 births
Living people
Association football midfielders
Australian soccer players
Australia under-20 international soccer players
National Premier Leagues players
Central Coast Mariners FC players
HNK Hajduk Split players
Sydney FC players
NK Rudeš players
Croatian Football League players
First Football League (Croatia) players
Second Football League (Croatia) players
Australian people of Croatian descent
Expatriate footballers in Croatia
Australian expatriate sportspeople in Croatia
Australian expatriate soccer players